The Opel Junior is a concept car designed and produced by the German automobile manufacturer Opel. It was first shown to the public at the 1983 Frankfurt Motor Show in September 1983.

The interior design was modular, with the dashboard elements being removable, such as the stereo and clock, and the seat covers could be used as sleeping bags. The design of the Opel Junior was based on the Opel Corsa, and it was a three door hatchback (two door, front engine).

The nameplate Junior was used as the codename for the Opel Adam, which was released in the end of 2012. The Adam’s official name was released in April 2012.

References

Junior
Subcompact cars
Hatchbacks